The Fichtelgebirge Club ( or FGV) is a large walking club and local heritage society in Bavaria and recognised conservation group with 20,000 members in 55 local groups. As the name says, its main sphere of activity is in the Fichtelgebirge mountains in north Bavaria. Its emblem is the Arctic starflower (the Siebenstern).

Address
Headquarters: Theresienstraße 2, 95632 Wunsiedel in the Haus des Fichtelgebirgsvereins (near the Marktplatz/Rathaus); Expertise and service centre for hiking, paths, conservation, culture and local history; regional specialist library.; FGV Shop; conference and exhibition rooms.

Club aims
The aims of the club are the fostering of hiking, training of hiking guides, marking of footpaths, construction and maintenance of rock climbing facilities, observation towers and accommodation facilities, conservation work and support, landscape conservation, support of local culture, monument protection, running the Fichtelgebirge Museum and other local history and natural history collections, publication of the club magazine Der Siebenstern and other heritage publications, youth work and youth support.

History
In 1878 the Fichtelgebirge Section (Sektion Fichtelgebirg) of the German and Austrian Alpine Club was founded in Wunsiedel. From the outset it focussed only on the development of the Fichtelgebirge. In 1888 the section was disbanded and the FGV founded with its headquarters in Wunsiedel. For a long time it was headed by the master forester (Forstmeister) of Wunsiedel. Over the course of time branches were formed in the surrounding villages and around the turn of the 20th century membership numbers had risen to 1000.
The club enjoyed encouraging growth Aufschwung after the First World War, in 1924 it had 38 local branches with 7000 members. After the Second World War, which had brought the club's activities to a standstill, it underwent a rapid regeneration which saw the foundation of numerous youth groups. In 1936 the headquarters of the club moved to Hof; it returned to Wunsiedel in 2003/04.

Local branches
The club has branches in the following places: Arzberg, Asch (CZ), Bad Alexandersbad, Bad Berneck, Bayreuth, Berlin, Bischofsgrün, Brand/Opf., Ebnath, Fichtelberg, Franken, Gefrees, Goldkronach, Grafenreuth, Hallerstein, Hof/Saale, Hohenberg an der Eger, Kemnath, Kirchenlamitz, Kulmbach, Marktleuthen, Marktredwitz, Mehlmeisel, Münchberg, Nagel, Nemmersdorf, Neusorg, Niederlamitz, Nuremberg, Oberkotzau, Oberwarmensteinach, Pegnitz, Plauen, Pullenreuth, Rehau, Röslau, Schirnding, Schönwald, Schwarzenbach (Saale), Schwarzenhammer, Selb-Stadt, Selb-Plößberg, Sparneck, Speichersdorf, Thiersheim, Thierstein, Tröstau, Vordorf, Waldershof, Warmensteinach, Weidenberg, Weißenstadt, Weißenstein-Verein, Wunsiedel, Zell im Fichtelgebirge.

Facilities

Accommodation

 Kösseinehaus
 Seehaus
 Waldsteinhaus
 Ochsenkopfhaus
 Asenturm-Tagesgaststätte
 Marktredwitzer Haus
 Gänskopfhütte
 Tauritzmühle
 Vordorfer Haus
 Marktleuthener Haus
 Weißensteinhaus

Observation towers

 Schönburgwarte on the Großer Kornberg
 Kösseine Tower
 Asenturm on the Ochsenkopf
 Waldenfelswarte on the Kohlberg near Arzberg
 Prinz Rupprecht Tower near Bad Berneck

Rock climbing sites

 Arnsteinfels
 Hirschstein
 Großer Haberstein near the Luisenburg
 Prinzenfelsen
 Nußhardtfelsen
 Rudolfstein
 Weißmainfelsen
 Wetzsteinfelsen
 Lug ins Land
 Schüssel on dem Waldstein
 Hoher Stein
 Hügelfelsen
 Katzentrögel (abandoned in 2007)
 Saubadfelsen
 Reiseneggerfelsen

Marked footpaths: 4,110 km

FGV main footpaths
 Franconian Mountain Way (Fränkische Gebirgsweg); length in the Fichtelgebirge 260 km
 West Way (Westweg, white "W" on red background), length c. 76 km
 Münchberg – Weißenstein (near Stammbach) – Gefrees – Stein – Bad Berneck – Fürstenstein – Sophienthal – Gänskopfhütte – Haidenaabquelle – Ahornberg – Immenreuth – Kemnath – Rauher Kulm
 High Way (Höhenweg, white "H" on red background) c. 46 km
 Schwarzenbach/Saale – Großer Waldstein – Weißenstadt – Rudolfstein – Schneeberg – Nußhardt – Seehaus – Platte – Silberhaus – Hohe Mätze – Kösseine – Haberstein – Luisenburg – Wunsiedel
 North Way (Nordweg, white "N" on red background) c. 66 km
 Kulmbach – Fölschnitz- Wirsberg – Gefrees – Großer Waldstein – Epprechtstein – Kirchenlamitz – Hirschstein – Kornberg – Vorsuchhütte- Selb – Hirschfelder Tor
 Middle Way (Mittelweg, black "M" on yellow background) c. 68 km
 Bayreuth – Untersteinach – Königsheide – Ochsenkopf – Weißmainquelle – Weißmainfelsen – Seehaus – Vordorfermühle – Vordorf – Zeitelmoos – Thierstein – Hohenberg/Eger
 South Way (Südweg, black "S" on yellow background) c. 68 km
 Wirsberg – Neuenmarkt – Bad Berneck – Goldmühl – Warmensteinach – Bayreuther Haus – Immenreuth – Armesberg – Friedenfels – Wiesau
 East Way (Ostweg, white "O" on red background) c. 57 km
 Tripoint (Dreiländereck) – branch to Rehau – Rehau – Wildenau – Wartberg – Großer Hengstberg – Hohenberg/Eger – Schirnding – Kappel – Waldsassen
 Steinwald Way (Steinwaldweg, white and red bars) c. 38 km
 Kösseinegipfel – Langentheilen – Katzentrögel/Platte – Weißenstein – Teichelberg – Waldsassen
 Springs Way (Quellenweg, black "Q" on yellow background) c. 46 km
 Münchberg – Zell – source of the Saxon Saale – Eger source – Weißenhaider Eck -Karches – White Main source – Weißmainfelsen – Fichtelnaab source – Fichtelsee – Nagel – Luisenburg – Alexandersbad – Marktredwitz
 Eger Way (Egerweg, black "E" on yellow background) c. 43 km
 Egerquelle – Weißenstadt – Röslau – Marktleuthen – Schwarzenhammer – Wellerthal – Hohenberg/ Eger – Fischern
 Röslau Way (Röslauweg, black "R" on yellow background) c. 40 km
 Röslau source – Vordorfermühle – Leupoldsdorf – Tröstau – Wunsiedel – Lorenzreuth – Seußen – Arzberg – Schirnding – Fischen

External links
 fichtelgebirgsverein.de

Hiking organisations in Germany
Fichtel Mountains
19th-century establishments in Bavaria